The Night Driver Tour 2017 is a 2017 concert tour by English pop rock band Busted. It will support the band's third studio album Night Driver (2016) and will be their second tour since their split in 2005.

The support act was Natives during the first leg off the tour in the United Kingdom and Ireland.

Setlist                                                
 "Kids with Computers"                                   
 "Thinking of You"
 "On What You're On"
 "Air Hostess"
 "Night Driver"
 "Nerdy"
 "Without It"
 "I Will Break Your Heart"
 "Who's David"
 "Sleeping with the Light On"
 "Crashed the Wedding"
 "3AM"
 "New York"
 "Year 3000"
 "What I Go to School For"
 "Coming Home"
 "Those Days are Gone"

Japan Setlist

 "Air Hostess"
 "Thinking of You"
 "On What You're On"
 "Night Driver"
 "Nerdy"
 "Who's David"
 "I Will Break Your Heart"
 "Meet You There"
 "Crashed the Wedding"
 "Sleeping with the Light On"
 "New York"
 "You Said No
 "What I Go to School For"
 "Those Days are Gone"
 "Coming Home"
 "Year 3000"

Royal Albert Hall Show

 "When Day Turns Into Night"                                   
 "Meet You There"
 "With Out You"
 "Everything I Knew"
 "Who's David"
 "Over Now"
 "Don't Dream It's Over - Crowded House cover"
 "Easy"
 "Sleeping With the Light On"
 "Air Hostess"
 "On What You're On"
 "Falling for You"
 "Loser Kid"
 "Night Driver"
 "I Will Break Your Heart"
 "That Thing You Do"
 "New York"
 "Crashed the Wedding"
 "3am"
 "What I Go to School For"
 "Those Days Are Gone"
 "Coming Home"
 "Year 3000"

Tour dates

Reference:

References

Busted (band)
2017 concert tours